Catherine of Castile may refer to:

Catherine of Lancaster, Queen consort of Castile
Catherine of Castile, Infanta of Castile and Aragon, Duchess of Villena
Catherine, Princess of Asturias
Catherine of Aragon, Infanta of Castile and Aragon, Queen consort of England
Catherine of Austria, Infanta of Castile and Aragon, Queen consort of Portugal